Grays Harbor College is a public community college in Aberdeen, Washington. Founded in 1930, the college sits on a  campus overlooking the town of Aberdeen and its seaport on the edge of the Pacific Ocean.  Additional "learning centers" are located in Raymond, Ilwaco, North Aberdeen, and Southside Aberdeen.

Athletics 
Grays Harbor College competes in the Northwest Athletic Conference (NWAC) as the Chokers, fielding men's teams for baseball and wrestling, women's teams for soccer, softball and volleyball and men's and women's teams for basketball and golf.

Notable alumni 

 Brian Blake, former member of the Washington House of Representatives
 John Madden, former football coach and sportscaster (did not graduate)
 Allan Mustard, United States ambassador to Turkmenistan
 Robert Rozier, convicted murderer and former NFL player
 Max Vekich, former member of the Washington House of Representatives and labor leader
 John Workman, comic book artist, writer, and letterer
 Bryan Danielson, Professional Wrestler, Independents, Ring of Honor Wrestling, World Wrestling Entertainment, All Elite Wrestling

References

External links
Official website

Aberdeen, Washington
Community colleges in Washington (state)
Universities and colleges accredited by the Northwest Commission on Colleges and Universities
Educational institutions established in 1930
Two-year colleges in the United States
Education in Grays Harbor County, Washington
Buildings and structures in Grays Harbor County, Washington
1930 establishments in Washington (state)